Raymond Willis Poat (December 19, 1917 – April 29, 1990) was an American professional baseball player native to Chicago. A right-handed pitcher, he played six Major League seasons, for the Cleveland Indians from 1942 to 1944, the New York Giants from 1947 to 1949, and the Pittsburgh Pirates in 1949.

He was traded along with Bobby Rhawn from the Giants to the Pirates for Kirby Higbe on June 6, 1949.

Poat appeared in 116 MLB games (47 as a starting pitcher) and an even 400 innings. He allowed 425 hits and 162 bases on balls, recording 178 strikeouts. He was a very successful hurler in minor league baseball, winning 91 of 135 decisions (.674).

Hitting for the "season cycle"

Poat became the first Major League player to achieve a season cycle, which is getting just four hits in a season, yet getting one hit of each type: single, double, triple and home run.

References

External links

1917 births
1990 deaths
Baltimore Orioles (IL) players
Baseball players from Chicago
Cleveland Indians players
Cedar Rapids Raiders players
Indianapolis Indians players
Leaksville-Draper-Spray Triplets players
Major League Baseball pitchers
New York Giants (NL) players
Pittsburgh Pirates players